Luk Keng Village or Luk Keng Tsuen is a village located on the Yam O peninsula on Lantau Island in the New Territories of Hong Kong, which links to Cheung Sok, a nearby uninhabited island, via a sandbank. Although nearby areas including Sunny Bay station have been developed, Luk Keng Village is still preserved as an undeveloped rural heritage area.

Administration
Luk Keng is a recognized village under the New Territories Small House Policy.

History
In December 2007, archaeologists found a number of Tang dynasty (618907) kilns in Luk Keng Village, although some of these had been destroyed by the construction of a barbecue area by the Hong Kong SAR Government.

Transportation 
MTR: Sunny Bay station (About 30-minutes' walk from Station Exit A to the village)
 From the Luk Keng Pier there a kai-to transportation service to Tsing Lung Tau in Tsuen Wan.

References

External links

 Delineation of area of existing village Luk Keng (Ma Wan) for election of resident representative (2019 to 2022)

Villages in Tsuen Wan District, Hong Kong
Yam O